Mecklenburg is a town in Fetakgomo Tubatse Local Municipality in the Limpopo province of South Africa ruled by the Magadimane Ntweng Chiefancy.

References

Populated places in the Fetakgomo Tubatse Local Municipality